James Johns may refer to:

James Johns (politician) (1893–1959), Australian politician
James Edward Johns (1900–1984), American football player